Mlle Guerin (born c. 1739, fl. 1755) was a French composer. She composed an opera at age 16, titled Daphnis et Amalthée which was performed in Amiens in 1755. An anonymous writer reporting the event in the Mercure de France described her as coming from the "provinces" and having a good education.

References 

1739 births
Year of death unknown
18th-century French people
18th-century French composers
Women classical composers
French opera composers
Women opera composers
18th-century women composers